Iron Sky is a 2012 Finnish science fiction comedy film.

Iron Sky may also refer to:

 Iron Sky: The Coming Race the sequel
 Iron Sky: Invasion, a video game based on the film
 "Iron Sky" (song), 2014 song by Paolo Nutini
 "Iron Sky", single by Mega City Four, 1993